Angel is the surname of Greek and Latin origin, and is normally a short form of other Greek-based names such as; Angelos, Angelis, Angelopoulos, or Di Angelo (Italian). It ultimately derives from the Greek personal name Ευάγγελος (Evangelos) meaning 'bringer of good news' or 'messenger'. Here are a few individuals with the surname

 Aetheria Angel (born 1998), actor 
 Asher Angel (born 2002), American actor
 Benjamin F. Angel (1815–1894), American diplomat
 Fernand Angel (1881–1950), French herpetologist
 Gustafva Angel (1838–1919), Swedish inventor
 Hayyim Angel, rabbi and author
 Hayyim Vidal Angel, Greek rabbi
 Heather Angel (actress) (1909–1986), English actress
 Heather Angel (photographer) (born 1941), British nature photographer, author and television presenter
 Jack Angel (1930–2021), American voice actor and radio personality
 James R. Angel (1836–1899), Washington Territory and New York City politician
 Jim Angel (1940–2007), Australian radio news presenter
 Jimmie Angel (1899–1956), American aviator and namesake of Angel Falls
 John Lawrence Angel (1915–1986), anthropologist
 Juan Pablo Ángel (born 1975), Colombian footballer
 Katherine Angel, British academic 
 Marc D. Angel, rabbi and author
 Marie Angel (artist) (1923–2010), English artist and illustrator
 Mark Angel (footballer), footballer
 Mark Angel (comedian), comedian
 Paula Angel (c. 1842–1861), Mexican-American woman executed for the murder of her lover
 Vanessa Angel (born 1966), English-American actress and model
 Wilkes Angel (1817–1889), New York politician
 William G. Angel (1790–1858), Congressman from New York
 William P. Angel (1813–1869), New York politician
 Zuzu Angel (1921–1976), Brazilian-American fashion designer who opposed the Brazilian military dictatorship after the disappearance of her son